Wiesinger is a surname of German origin. Notable people with the surname include:

Herbert Wiesinger (born 1948), German former pair skater
Kai Wiesinger (born 1966), German television and film actor
Michael Wiesinger (born 1972), German football manager and former player
Paula Wiesinger (later Steger; 1907–2001), pioneering Italian alpine skier and mountain climber
Philipp Wiesinger (born 1994), Austrian footballer
Steffen Wiesinger (born 1969), German fencer

See also
Wiesing

German-language surnames
German toponymic surnames